Glenn D. "Mike" Vosburg (December 29, 1883 – July 30, 1964) was an American football and basketball coach and college athletics administrator.  He was the 17th head football coach at Washburn University in Topeka, Kansas, serving for one season, in 1922, and compiling a record of 1–7.  Football legend Walter Camp stated that the 1922 squad had several good players but produced disappointing results.  Vosburg was also the head basketball coach at Washburn in 1922–23, tallying a mark of 7–11.  He was also and assistant coach for the Great Lakes Navy Bluejackets football team at Naval Station Great Lakes before coming to Washburn.

Vosburg was born on December 29, 1883, in Fort Atkinson, Wisconsin.  He died on July 30, 1964, at Fort Atkinson Memorial Hospital.

Head coaching record

Football

References

1883 births
1964 deaths
Basketball coaches from Wisconsin
Great Lakes Navy Bluejackets football coaches
People from Fort Atkinson, Wisconsin
Sportspeople from the Milwaukee metropolitan area
Washburn Ichabods athletic directors
Washburn Ichabods football coaches
Washburn Ichabods men's basketball coaches